Sreekumar Achary (born 5 January 1951), better known by his stage name Jagathy Sreekumar or simply Jagathy, is an Indian actor, director and playback singer, who has appeared in over 1500 Malayalam films in a career spanning almost four decades. Widely regarded as one of the most influential actor and finest comedian in the history of Malayalam cinema, he is also known for his highly nuanced character roles. He is the son of acclaimed dramaturge and writer, the late Jagathy N. K. Achary.

Jagathy Sreekumar won five Kerala State Film Awards among numerous other awards for his roles in various films. He has also directed two films and written screenplays for two more. His stage name is derived from the neighborhood of Jagathy in Trivandrum from where he hails. He is an outspoken orator holding strong views, quite unlike his onscreen image and his speeches are still popular.

Jagathy was involved in a vehicle accident in March 2012 and was hospitalized for over a year. He is still on the long road to complete recovery. His film career has been on hold since the accident. In May 2022, Jagathy returned to the big screen with the CBI 5: The Brain directed by K. Madhu. In the film, he did not have any dialogues and reprised the memorable character CID Vikram, which he played in the previous films of the CBI series.

Early life and family

Sreekumar is the eldest son of Malayalam dramatist and writer Jagathy N. K. Achary (1924–1997) (also fondly known as Jagathy) and his wife Prasanna from the famed Edavancaud family of Mavelikkara. N. K. Achary was Station Director at All India Radio, Trivandrum. Sreekumar has two siblings, Krishnakumar and Jameela; and two step-siblings Murali and Sugadamma.

"My father was my strength. He used to take me to movies and bring home scripts of plays for me to read. Being in All India Radio, my father had contacts with stalwarts in this field. He created many opportunities for me to interact with them. This helped me in my career.", says Jagathy Sreekumar about his father. He attended the Higher Secondary School in Cheriyanad, Chengannur, and graduated with a bachelor's degree in botany from Mar Ivanios College, Trivandrum where eminent personalities like K. Jayakumar and Ravi Vallathol were his classmates.. After college, he briefly worked as a medical representative before later becoming an actor.

Acting career
When Jagathy was a fifth grade student at Model School in Trivandrum when he first got the opportunity to act in a school play. The play he acted was "Onamundum Odakkuzhalum" by Sreemandiram K.P. He continued to act in plays written by his father NK Achary for Kalanilayam, in big and small roles. By this time he joined Mar Ivanios College, Trivandrum.

Jagathy made his debut in Malayalam cinema in 1974 by playing a small role in Kanyakumari. He got a breakthrough in his career with his second film Chattambi Kalyani (1975) where he played the role of Pappu. Since then, he went on to play comedy roles in numerous movies. Jagathy started to become an integral part of Malayalam cinema during the early 1980s. He was a constant fixture in Priyadarshan films with Mohanlal coming in the lead role in many of them. Jagathy-Mohanlal combo also resulted in some of the hit movies during the 1980s such as Poochakkoru Mookkuthi, Boeing Boeing, Aram + Aram = Kinnaram, Mazha Peyyunnu Maddalam Kottunnu, Hello My Dear Wrong Number, Thalavattam, Mukunthetta Sumitra Vilikkunnu and Ninnistham Ennishtam. Jagathy was appraised for his performance as Kavala in the sentimental drama film Moonnam Pakkam (1988). The same year he played Vikram in Oru C.B.I Diary Kurippu and reprised the character in the sequel of the movie. Jagathy won the Kerala State Film Award For Second Best Actor in 1991 for his performance in the cult classic comedy movie Kilukkam and Apoorvam Chilar. He played Nischal, a comedy character in Kilukkam whereas in Apoorvam Chilar, he played a character role. Jagathy played the role of a patient escaped from mental hospital with his group of friends in Mookilla Rajyathu (1991). This movie later developed a cult following. One of the best characters played by Jagathy is Arasumootil Appukuttan in Yoddha (1992). Yoddha is considered one of the best comedy films in Malayalam where Jagathy played an integral part in it. Jagathy was praised for his performance as Jayakrishnan in Melepparambil Aanveedu (1993). His lead role in Kabooliwala (1994) alongside Innocent was accalimed. The duo played the characters called Kannas and Kadalas in the movie respectively. The same year he played another memorable role in Minnaram. Vattoli Porinju is a popular character from the movie Olympian Anthony Adam (1999). His other notable movies among many in the 1990s include Nagarangalil Chennu Raparkam, Cheriya Lokavum Valiya Manushyarum (1990), Kottayam Kunjachan, Koodikazhca, Kadinjool Kalyanam, Georgekutty C/O Georgekutty (1991), Ezhara Ponnana (1992), Pidakkozhi Koovunna Noottandu, Vadhu Doctoranu, Pingami, Malappuram Haji Mahanaya Joji, Kinnaripuzhayoram, CID Unnikrishnan B.A., B.Ed (1994), Vrudhanmare Sookshikkuka, Puthukottyile Puthu Manavalan, Kusruthikaatu (1995), Kalyana Sowgandhikam, Kaathil Oru Kinnaram (1996), Arjunan Pillayum Anchu Makkalum, Kilukil Pambaram, Junior Mandrake (1997), Meenathil Thalikettu, Kottaram Veettile Apputtan, Mangalya Pallakku, Mayilpeelikkavu, Grama Panchayath, Alibabayum Arara Kallanmarum, Sreekrishnapurathe Nakshathrathilakkam (1998), Udayapuram Sulthan, Vazhunnor, Tokyo Nagarathile Viseshangal, Pattabhishekam and Friends (1999).

Jagathy reunited with Priyadarshan in 2001 with Kakkakkuyil, which was commercially successful. Jagathy's role as Krishnavilasom Bhageeratan Pilla aka Pillechan in the comedy drama Meesa Madhavan (2002) is often considered one of his career best. This character as well as the movie itself eventually developed a cult following. Jagathy won his second Kerala State Film Award for his performance in Meesa Madhavan and for doing a character role in Nizhalkuthu. The same year he played another memorable comedy character Kumbidi in Nandanam. Some of his memorable roles in 2003 came out with the movies such as Mr. Brahmachari, Thilakkam, Kilichundan Mampazham, Sadanandante Samayam, Vellithira, Swapnam Kondu Thulabharam, C.I.D. Moosa, Meerayude Dukhavum Muthuvinte Swapnavum, Balettan, Hariharan Pillai Happy Aanu, Pulival Kalyanam and Pattanathil Sundaran. Jagathy's next film directed by Priyadarshan after Kilichundan Mambazhan was through Vettam in 2004, where he played as a comic serial killer called Basha. Another popular comedy character of Jagathy is Pachalam Bhasi which came out with Udayananu Tharam (2005). In 2006, Jagathy reprised his role as Nischal in Kilukkam Kilu Kilukkam, the sequel of Kilukkam. However the movie was a commercial failure and received negative reviews. Jagathy's role as a fake human god known as Himavalswami in Makante Achan (2009) was acclaimed. Jagathy's other best comedy movies in the 2000s includes Vellinakshatram (2004), Naran, Kochi Rajavu (2005), Classmates (2006), The Speed Track, Chota Mumbai, Hallo, Rock & Roll (2007), Crazy Gopalan, Twenty:20 (2008), Sagar Alias Jacky Reloaded and Evidam Swargamanu (2009).

Jagathy's role as Member Ramanan in Elsamma Enna Aankutty (2010) was appreciated and the movie was a box office success. His other notable movies in 2012 are Marykkundoru Kunjaadu and Pranchiyettan and the Saint. The last film he completed before his 2012 road accident was Parudeesa.

Jagathy has also played memorable character roles in numerous movies. Most of them have a comic shade while others are purely character roles. He played a complex character called Unnithan Aashan in Vaasthavam (2006). He won the Kerala State Film Award – Special Mention in 2007 for his performance in Paradesi and Veeralipattu. Jagathy played the lead role in Raamanam (2009) which earned him that years Kerala State Film Special Jury Award. Jagathy's other notable character roles are seen in movies such as Vesham (2004), Thanmathra (2005), Chess, Palunku (2006), Manchadikkuru (2008), Pazhassi Raja (2009), Indian Rupee (2011) Kerala Cafe (2009) Manikiakkallu (2011) Christian Brothers (2011) Janapriyan (2011) and 1993 Bombay, March 12 (2011).

Apart from playing comedy roles and comic character and negative roles, Jagathy has played some characters with complete negative shades, including his roles as Chenicheri Kurup in Urumi (2011) and Home Minister in Passenger (2009). Arabikkatha (2007) and Cycle (2008) are also such movies.

He made his comeback after 2012 road accident through CBI 5: The Brain released in 2022.

Personal life

Jagathy married Mallika Sukumaran in 1974 and divorced in 1976. He married Shoba in 1980. They have a son, Rajkumar, and a daughter, Parvathy. Just days before the March 2012 road accident that took away years of his life, Jagathy had publicly revealed that he had a daughter Sreelakshmi Sreekumar, with actress Kala, also said to be his second wife.

Accident

On 10 March 2012, he was seriously injured in a road accident at Panambra near the Calicut University at Tenhipalam in Malappuram district. He was immediately rushed to MIMS Hospital in Calicut, where he remained for one month. Later, he was taken to Vellore Christian Medical College for advanced treatment. He underwent multiple surgical procedures. He remained in hospital for twelve months, appearing in public for the first time in March 2013, unable to speak. In 2014, he was again taken to Vellore for further check-ups and returned to his home later. Recently he appeared in a private channel during onam with Nedumudi Venu in which he sang old songs.

Awards

 Other awards
 2003 - Bahadoor Award for his contributions to Malayalam cinema
 2005 - Prem Nazir Award for his contributions to Malayalam cinema spanning three decades
 2005 - Sathyan Memorial Award
2009 - Utsav Film Awards Lifetime Achievement Award for overall contribution to Malayalam cinema
 2011 - The Kochi Times Film Award - Best Actor in a Negative Role in Urumi
 2012 -  Thikkurussy Award for Most Popular Actor

Partial filmography

Malayalam

 Achanum Makanum (1957) as Vikraman (Child Artist)
 Kanyakumari (1974) as Tourist
 Chattambi Kalyani (1975) as Pappu
 MohiniYattom (1975)
 Hello Darling (1975) as Vijayan
 Sreedevi (1977)
  Poojakkedukkatha Pookkal (1977) as Chacko Mundurkonam
 Shantha Oru Devatha (1977)
 Aadyapaadam (1977)
 Kalpavriksham (1978) as Saimon
 Kaathirunna Nimisham (1978) as V. N. Kumaran
 Madalasa (1978) as Nandagopal
 Rowdy Ramu (1978) as Conductor
 Etho Oru Swapnam (1978) as Engineer Janardhanan Nair
 Mattoru Karnan (1978) (as Jagathy Sreekumar)
 Ashtamudikkaayal (1978) 
 Ulkadal (1979) as Jayashankar
 Puthiya Velicham (1979) as Parippuvada Kuttappan
 Enikku Njaan Swantham (1979) as Kili Balan
 Prabhatha Sandhya (1979)
 Koumara Praayam (1979) as Vasu
 Avano Atho Avalo (1979) as Velappan
 Venalil Oru Mazha (1979)
 Neeyo Njaano (1979) as Kaalan Muthu
 Kazhukan (1979)
 Swathu (1980) as Vikraman Raja
 Air Hostess (1980) as C I Damodharankutty
 Agnikshetram (1980) as Thoma
 Chandrahasam (1980) as Kumar
 Sakthi (1980) as Thilakan
 Manushya Mrugam (1980) as Anandan
 Lava (1980) as Kuttappan
 Kari Puranda Jeevithangal (1980)
 Paalattu Kunjikannan (1980) as Soldier
 Ambalavilakku (1980) as Vasutty
 Idimuzhakkam (1980) as Rajan Unnithan/Thyagacharya
 Aniyatha Valakkal (1980) as Varghese Ithile vannavar {1980} as shankarankutty
 Pappu (1980)
 Kadathu (1981) as Meesha Vasu Pilla
 Thakilu Kottampuram (1981) as Shishupalan
 Karimpoocha (1981) as Pappu
 Sanchari (1981) as Mani
 Kattukallan (1981) as Mallan
 Ellam Ninakku Vendi (1981) as Kuruppu
 Sphodanam' (1981) as Kuttan Pilla
 Munnettam (1981) as Gopi
 Agni Yudham (1981)
 Sangharsham (1981) as  Unnikrishnan
 Oothikachiya Ponnu (1981) as Vaasu
 Ammakkorumma (1981) as IPS officer Bhadran
 Yavanika (1982) (as Jagathi) as Varunan
 Kaalam (1982) as Gopalan
 Ethiralikal (1982) as Tube
 Irattimadhuram (1982) as Unnikrishnan
 Kaattile Paattu (1982) as Bombay Dharam
 Olangal (1982)
 Kurukkante Kalyanam (1982) as Kumar
 Kelkatha Shabdam (1982) as Kora
 Ithu Njangalude Katha (1982) as Vasu
 Chilanthivala (1982) as Sayippu
 Karthavyam (1982) as Mohan Prakash
 Njan Ekananu (1982) as Sreekumaran
 Olangal (1982)
 Marupacha (1982) as Kumar
 Raktha Sakshi (1982)
 Maattuvin Chattangale (1982) as Constable Rajappan
 Snehapoorvam Meera (1982) as Karunan
 Aranjaanam (1982) as Professor
 Chillu (1982) as James
 Balloon (1982)
 Nizhal Moodiya Nirangal (1983) as Nanappan
 Mazhanilavu (1983) as Pushpangathan
 Eettappuli (1983)
 Ankam (1983) as Ponnan
 Rathilayam (1983)
 Mandanmmar Londanil (1983) as Rasheed
 Oomai Kuyil (1983)
 Kaathirunna Divasam (1983) as Narayanan
 Thimingalam (1983)
 Aadhipathyam (1983) as Kuttappan
 Kayam (1983)
 Rachana (1983) as Thomas
 Prathigna (1983) as Anthappan
 Oru Mukham Pala Mukham (1983)
 Aana (1983) as Moidu
 Himavahini (1983) as Hamsa
 Changatham (1983) as Sulfikar
 Attakkalasam (1983) as Josekutty
 Asthram (1983) as Philip
 Aa Rathri (1983) as Sundaresan
 Manassoru Mahaasamudram (1983) as Raghavan
 Bullet (1984)
 Thirakal (1984) as Varkey
 Panchavadi Palam (1984) as Abel
 Kodathi (1984) as Vasu
 Shree Krishnaparanthu (1984) as Gopalan
 Oru Sumangaliyude Katha (1984) as Sunil Kumar
 Vanitha Police (1984) as Sivan Pillai
 Oru Nimisham Tharoo (1984)
 Chakkarayumma (1984) as Rahman
 Shabadham (1984) as Phalgunan
 Uyarangalil (1984) as Pillai
 Swanthamevide Bandhamevide (1984) as Gopan
 Poochakkoru Mookkuthi (1984) as Chellappan
 Parannu Parannu Parannu (1984)
 Manasariyathe (1984) as Ambilykuttan
 My Dear Kuttichathan (1984)
 Kaliyil Alpam Karyam (1984) as Vasunni
 Ivide Ingane (1984) as Kuttappan
 Itha Innu Muthal (1984) as 'Kundar' Kuttappan
 Nerariyum Nerathu (1985) as Kuttappan Bhagavathar
 Onningu Vannengil (1985) as Esthappan
 Black Mail (1985)
 Mulamoottil Adima (1985) as Lawrence Michael
  Oru Sandesham Koodi (1985) as Raju
 Sammelanam (1985) as Thankappan
 Mukhyamanthri (1985) as Kozhivila
 Puzhayozhugum Vazhi (1985) as Sukumaran
 Revenge (1985) as Babu
 Chorakku Chora (1985) as Kunjappan
 Vellarikka Pattanam (1985) as Porinju
 Vasantha Sena (1985) as Albert
 Mutharamkunnu P.O. (1985) as M. K. Nakulan
 Koodum Thedi (1985) as Laser
 Pathamudayam (1985)
 Ithu Nalla Thamasa (1985) as Basheer Pillai
 Boeing Boeing (1985) as O. P. Olassa
 Azhiyatha Bandhangal (1985) as Sugunachandran
 Aram + Aram = Kinnaram (1985) as Manoharan
 Muhurtham Pathnonnu Muppathinu (1985) as Laser
 Ee Sabdam Innathe Sabdam (1985) as Nanukuttan Pillai
 Vivahitare Itihile (1986) as Jerry
 Karinagam (1986)
 Thalavattam (1986) (as Jagathi) as Narayan
 Annoru Ravil (1986) as Vicky
 Ninnishtam Ennishtam (1986)
 Kochu Themmadi (1986) as Balan Mesthiri
  Niramulla Raavukal (1986) (1986) as Ravunni
 Sughamodevi (1986) as Vinod
 Revathikkoru Pavakkutty (1986) as Kalyan Kumar
 Iniyum Kurukshethram (1986) as Neeretupuram Narayanankutty
 Hello My Dear: Wrong Number (1986) as Cop
 Ente Sonia (1986) as (P C) Veeran
 Ennennum Kannettante (1986) as Padmanabhan Pillai
 Kulambadikal (1986)
 Ambadi Thannilorunni (1986) as Suni Mon
 Arappatta Kettiya Gramathil (1986) as Bhasi
 Katturumbinum Kathukuthu (1986) as Settu
 Ente Shabdam (1986) as Kalavattom Vasu
 Adiverukal (1986) as Koshi
 Manasilloru Manimuthu (1986) 
 Dheem Tharikida Thom (1986) as Shankaran Pillai
 Mazha Peyyunnu Maddalam Kottunnu (1986) as Sardar Krishna Kurup
 Kshamichu Ennoru Vakku (1986) .... Watch Paramu
 Yagagni (1987) as Kurup
 Ayitham (1987) as N S Thovala
 Kadhakku Pinnil (1987) as Vishambharan
 Neeyallengil Njan (1987) as Ramankutty
 Penn Simham (1987)
 Vazhiyorakkazhchakal (1987) as Music teacher
 Thoovana Thumbigal (1987) as Ravunni Nair
 Sarvakalasala (1987) as Fr. Kuttanadan
 Naradhan Keralathil (1987) as Mathan
 Ivide Ellavarkkum Sukham (1987) as Shivasankara Varma
 January Oru Orma (1987) as Joseph
 Jaalakam (1987) as Principal
 Irupatham Noottandu (1987) as Chanakyan
 Boomiyile Rajakkanmar (1987) as Aromalunni
 Nombarathi Poovu (1987) as Sebastian
 Adimakal Udamakal (1987) as Mukundan
 Witness (1988) as Jayakumar
 Simon Peter Ninakku Vendi (1988) as Lazer
 Ponmuttayidunna Tharavu (1988)
 Mukunthetta Sumitra Vilikkunnu (1988) as Gopi
 Moonnam Pakkam (1988) as Kavala
 Loose Loose Arappiri Loose (1988) as Jagathi
 Dhwani (1988) as Manikanta Pillai
 Mrithyunjayam (1988) as Antony
 Oru Muthassi Kadha (1988) as Chellayyan
 Vicharana (1988) as Kuttappan
 Oru CBI Diary Kurippu (1988) as Vikram
 Alila Kuruvikal (1988)
 Inquilabinte Puthri (1988) as Kuttappan
 Daisy (1988)
 Rahasyam Parama Rahasyam (1988) as Nanappan
 1 August (1988) as Gopi
  Avanikunnile Kinnari Pookkal (1989) as Stephen Thomas
 Varnam (1989) as Venkidy
 Ulsavapittennu (1989) as Madhavan Kutty
 Season (1989)
 Pradeshika Varthakal (1989) as Thankachen
 Peruvannapurathe Visheshangal (1989) as Keeleri Padmanabhan
 Oru Sayahnathinte Swapnam (1989) as Stephan
 Kalpana House (1989) as Louis
 News (1989) as Karam
 Aksharathettu (1989) as Gowthaman
 Naaduvazhikal (1989) as Bawa
 Muthu Kudayum Choodi (1989)
 Kaalal Pada (1989)
 Mrigaya (1989)
 Charithram (1989)
 Ashokante Aswathikuttikku (1989)
 Kali karyamaai: Crime Branch (1989) as Alex
 Kireedam (1989)
 Jaathakam (1989) as Narayana Panikkar
 Innale (1989) as Azhagappan
 Devadas (1989) as Rajan
 Annakutty Kodambakkam Vilikkunnu (1989) as Manavendran/Kuttachan
 Chakkikotha Chankaran (1989) as Ouseppu
 Adikkurippu (1989) as Basheer
 Jagratha (1989), a.k.a. CBI Diary Part II (India: English title) as Vikram
 Kadathanadan Ambadi (1990) as Karkodakan
 Randam Varavu (1990) as Gopi
 Rajavazhcha (1990) as Mathai
 Orukkam (1990) as Anthrappayi
 Nagarangalil Chennu Raparkam (1990) as Abu Hassan
 Minda Poochakku Kalyanam (1990) as Sahadevan
 Ee Thanutha Veluppan Kalathu (1990)
 No 20 Madras Mail (1990)
 Marupuram (1990)
 Dr. Pasupathy (1990) as Nanappan
 Arhatha (1990) as Unni Unnithan
 Apoorva Sangamam (1990)
 Aanaval Mothiram (1990) as Chellappan
 Cheriya Lokavum Valiya Manushyarum (1990)
 Superstar (1990) as Vishalakshan
 Kottayam Kunjachan (1990)
 Anantha Vruthantham (1990) as Jathak Krishnan
 Oliyampukal (1990) as P. P. Vakkachan
 Ulladakkam (1991) as Mental patient
 Souhrudam (1991) as Mathachan
 Pookkalam Varavayi (1991) as Cherukunnathu Bhaskara Pillai
 Agni Nilavu (1991) as Kumar
  Chakravarthy (1991) as Sakthi
 May Dinam (1991) as Damodharan
 Thudarkadha (1991) as Nadanam Nanu
 Nettippattam (1991) as Ummini
 Mukha Chithram (1991) as Govinda Menon
 Mookkilyarajyathu (1991) as Krishnankutty
 Kizhakkunarum Pakshi (1991) as Vaidi
 Kuttapathram (1991) as Vishwan
 Koodikazhca (1991) as Mathew Pulikkadan
 Kilukkampetti (1991) as Mukundan
 Kilukkam (1991) as Nischal
 Kadinjool Kalyanam (1991) as Sivaraman
 Georgekutty C/O Georgekutty (1991) as Chandy
 Ganamela (1991) as Ganapathi
 Chanchattam (1991) as Roopesh Kumar
 Apoorvam Chilar (1991) as Sankara Warrier
 Yodha (1992) as Appukuttan
 Soorya Manasam (1992)
 Aparatha (1992) as Minnal Chacko
 Ardram (1992) as Vettichara Dimon
 Utsava Melam (1992)
 Rathachakram (1992) as Bhanuvikrama Shetty
 Ootty Pattanam (1992) as Basheer
 Nakshthrakoodaram (1992) as Bhaskara Kurup
 Naadody (1992) as Nair
 Kunjikkuruvi (1992)
 Maanyanmaar (1992)
 Kunukkitta Kozhi (1992)
 Kaazhchakkppuram (1992) as Koprapurakkal Chacko
 Ezhara Ponnana (1992) as Achu
 Ente Ponnu Thampuran (1992) as Prafulla Kumar
 Ellarum Chollanu (1992)
 Champakulam Thachan (1992) as Rajappan
 Ayalathe Addeham (1992) as Chandykunju
 Thalamura (1993)
  Porutham (1993) as Unnithan
 Gandharvam (1993) as Mesthri
 Sthalathe Pradhana Payyans (1993) as Salim
 Mithunam (1993) as Suguthan
 Kavadiyattam (1993) as Velappan
 Acharyan (1993) as Prabhakaran
 Kalippattam (1993)
 Kabuliwala (1993) as Kadalas
 Journalist (1993) as R. J. Kizhakkedam
 Janam (1993) as Vazhuthala Sasi
 Ekalavyan (1993) as Achuthan Nair
 Customs Diary (1993) as Aravindakshan
 Bhagyavan (1993) as Mathachan
 Bandhukkal Sathrukkal (1993)
 Ammayane Sathyam (1993) as Pisharadi
 Akashadoothu (1993) as Gevarghese Mathew
 Aayirappara (1993)
 Bhoomi Geetham (1993) as Adv Ganesh Iyyer
 O' Faby (1993) as Rappai
 Minnaram (1994)
 Vadhu Doctoranu (1994) as Kunjan Marar
 Sudha Mathalam (1994)
 Pingami (1994) as Kutti Hassan
 Pidakkozhi Koovunna Noottandu (1994) as Ikru – Sathyasheelan
 Rajadhani (1994) as Nadarajan
 Chukkan (1994) as Sreeraman
 Gandeevam (1994) as Pothuval
 Pakshe (1994)
 Manathe Kottaram (1994)
 Malappuram Haji Mahanaya Joji (1994)
 Kinnaripuzhayoram (1994) as Chacko
 CID Unnikrishnan B.A., B.Ed. (1994) as Ommen Koshy
 Chukkan (1994) as Sreeraman
 Cabinet (1994) as Colonel Varma
 Vishnu (1994) as Jameskutty
 Vrudhanmare Sookshikkuka (1995) as Rudran Pillai
 Tom & Jerry (1995) as Mukundan
 Boxer (1995) as Pachalam Sundaran
 Sargavasantham (1995) as Kunjunni
 Thovalapookkal (1995)
 Puthukottyile Puthu Manavalan (1995) as Madassery Kochu Thampi
 Punnaram (1995) as Raghavan
 Peterscott (1995)
 Pai Brothers (1995) as Ananda Pai
 Manikya Chempazhukka (1995) as L. Lalichan Peruvazhiyil
 Mangalam Veettil Manaseswari Gupta (1995) as Shivankutty
 Kusruthikaatu (1995) as Madhavan Kutty
 Kaattile Thadi Thevarude Ana (1995) as Venugopal/Manikantan
 Aksharam (1995) as Tharakan
 Aadyathe Kanmani (1995) as Sreedharan Unnithan
 Oru Abhibhashakante Case Diary (1995) as Mani Kunju
 Avittam Thirunaal Aarogya Sriman (1995)
 Vanarasena (1996) as Pankajakshan
 Madamma (1996) as Janmi
 Lalanam (1996)
 Kireedamillatha Rajakkanmar (1996) as Pushpull Rakhavan
 Kalyana Sowgandhikam (1996) as Mambally Vasudevan
 Kaathil Oru Kinnaram (1996) as Karunakaran
 Arjunan Pillayum Anchu Makkalum (1997)
 Ullasappoonkattu (1997)
 Suvarna Simhaasanam (1997) as Das G. Nair
 Newspaper Boy (1997) as K.K. Ponnappan
 Nee Varuvolam (1997)
 Manasam (1997) as Kichamani
 Kilukil Pambaram (1997)
 Kalyanappittannu (1997)
 Kalyana Kacheri (1997)
 Siamese Irattagal (1997)
 Junior Mandrake (1997)
 Hitler Brothers (1997) as Adv. Manmathan
 The Good Boys (1997) as Vikraman Nair
 Ekkareyanente Manasam (1997) as Radhakrishnan
 Meenathil Thalikettu (1998)
 Meenakshi Kalyanam (1998) as Earali Vasu
 Kottaram Veettile Apputtan (1998)
 Mayajalam (1998) as Ramesh Nambyar
 Mangalya Pallakku (1998) as Sankara Warrier
 Mayilpeelikkavu (1998)
 Magician Mahendralal from Delhi (1998) as Scaria, Magician Mahendralal
 Grama Panchayath (1998) as R. A. Jappan
 Elavamkodu Desam (1998) as Kurungodan
 Anuragakottaram (1998)
 Manthri Maalikayil Manasammatham (1998)
 Alibabayum Arara Kallanmarum (1998) as Thanku
 Vazhunnor (1999) as 'Meen' Mathachan
 Udayapuram Sulthan (1999) as Parasu Nampoothiri
 Captain (1999) as Ananthan Nambiar
 Jananayakan (1999) as Ayyappan
 Tokyo Nagarathile Viseshangal (1999)
 Swastham Grihabaranam (1999) as Pachu
 Prempujari (1999)
 Pranaya Nilavu (1999) as Kunjahammad
 Pattabhishekam (1999)
 Panchapandavar (1999) as Kunjunni
 Parasala Pachan Payyannoor Paramu (1999)
 Olympiyan Anthony Adam (1999)
 Njangal Santhushtaranu (1999) as Salperu Sadanandan
 Independence (1999) as Manmadhan Potti SI
 Friends (1999) as Chackachamparambil Lasar
 Deepasthambham Mahascharyam (1999) as Nalpamaram Nambeeshan
 Charlie Chaplin (1999)
 Chandamama (1999) as Eappachan
 Bharya Veettil Paramasukham (1999)
 American Ammayi (1999)
 Aakasha Ganga (1999)
 Varnnakazhchakal (2000)
 Priyam (2000)
 Pilots (2000) as Chacko
 Narashimham (2000)
 Mera Naam Joker (2000) as Parijakshan Pilla
 Nadan Pennum Natupramaniyum (2000)
 Mr. Butler (2000) as Achayan
 Anamuttathe Angalamar (2000) as Ramakrishnan
 Mazha (2000)
 Devadoothan (2000) (as Jagathi) as Priest
 Darling Darling (2000)
 Daivathinte Makan (2000)
 High Range (2000)
 Vakkalathu Narayanankutty (2001)
 Saivar Thirumeni (2001) as Kunjoottan
 Akashathile Paravakal (2001) as Dasan
 Onnaman (2001)
 Dosth (2001)
 Kakkakuyil (2001) as Advocate Nambishan
 Suryachakram (2001)
 Raavanaprabhu (2001) as Sakthivel Gounder
 Bharthavudyogam (2001) as Mathachan
 Nariman (2001) as Kochu Narayanan
 Achaneyanenikkishtam (2001) as Nalinakshan
 Thilakam (2002) as Pushpangadan
 Thandavam (2002) as Mathachan
 Savithriyute Aranjanam (2002) as Achu Maash
 Malayalimamanu Vanakkam (2002) as Kesunni
 Kuberan (2002) as S. I. Thimmayya
 Kasillatheyum Jeevikkam (2002)
 Kanmashi (2002) as Bhaskara Menon
 Kakke Kakke Koodevide (2002) as Pappachan
 Jagathi Jagathish in Town (2002) as Jagadeendran, Balakrishnan
 Ente Hridhayathinte Utama (2002)
 Chirikkudukka (2002) as Broker Nanukuttan
 Chathurangam (2002) as Kochausepp
 Bamboo Boys (2002) as Varkey
 Meesa Madhavan (2002) as Bhageerathan Pillai
 Nizhalkuthu (2002), a.k.a. Le Serviteur de Kali (France) as Maharajah's officer
 Nakshathrakkannulla Rajakumaran Avanundoru Rajakumari (2002) as Chanthutty
 Nandanam (2002) as Kumbidi
 Mazhanoolkkanavu (2003) as Nair
 Vasanthamalika (2003) as Bodheswaran
 Thillana Thillana (2003) as Ujjwal
 Mr. Brahmachari (2003) as V. V. T.
 Shikari Bolona (2003) as P P Gold Gopalan
 Thilakkam (2003) as Priest
 Kilichundan Mampazham (2003) as Irunthalakadan Nampoothiri
 Kalavarkey (2003) as Kalavarkey
 Sadanandante Samayam (2003)
 Vellithira (2003) as Erumathadam Jose
 Swapnam Kondu Thulabharam (2003) as Sivankutty
 C.I.D. Moosa (2003) as S. I. Peethambaran
 Meerayude Dukhavum Muthuvinte Swapnavum (2003) as Suseelan
 Balettan (2003) as K. K. Pisharadi
 Pattalam (2003) as Kumaran
 Melvilasam Sariyanu (2003) as Cheppankudi Gajaraja Bhagavathar (Rajappan)
 Mizhi Randilum (2003) as Thechikkattu Achuthankutti
 Hariharan Pillai Happy Aanu (2003) as Vasu
 Ammakilikkoodu (2003) as Arnose
 Valathottu Thirinjal Nalamathe Veedu (2003) as Setup Ramakrishnan
 Pulival Kalyanam (2003) as Paramanandan
 Pattanathil Sundaran (2003) as Kattuvalli Krishnan
 Relax (2003) as Abhirami
 Thalamelam (2004) as Dr. Gouri Shankar
 Kottaram Vaidyan (2004) as Appannan
 Agninakshathram (2004) as Jayanthan
 Vamanapuram Bus Route (2004) as Gopalan Nair
 Sethurama Iyer CBI (2004) as Vikram
 Symphony (2004) as Dominic
 C. I. Mahadevan 5 Adi 4 Inchu (2004) as Salgunan
 SanthanaGopalam (1994) as Ramkumar IPS
 Njan Salperu Ramankutty (2004) as Madhavan
 Vellinakshatram (2004) as Pooradam Thirunal Valiya Koyi Thampuran
 Kanninum Kannadikkum (2004) as Pushkaran
 Thekkekkara Superfast (2004) as Ahammad Kutty
 Jalolsavam (2004) as Ponnappan
 Chathikkatha Chanthu (2004) as Manthravadi
 Runway (2004) as Kariyachan
 Mayilattam (2004) as Dasan
 Wanted (2004) as Supru Murthy
 Aparichithan (2004) as Anamala Jolly
 Ee Snehatheerathu (2004) as Parasheri
  Govindankutty Thirakkilaanu (2004) as Marthandan Vakkeel
 Vettam (2004) as Paasha
 Kadhavaseshan (2004)
 Thudakkam (2004) as Ittoop
 Rasikan (2004) as Thomachan
 Vesham (2004) as Ganapathi Swamy
 Amrutham (2004) as Chandy
 Udayananu Tharam (2005) as Pachalam Bhasi
 Athbhutha Dweepu (2005) as Madhavan, Maharaja
 Kochi Rajavu (2005) as Sreemoolam Thirunal Easwaravarma Valiyakoyil Thampuran
 Alice in Wonderland (2005) as Fr. Ambatt
 Krithyam (2005) as Solomon Joseph
 Udayon (2005) as Shavappetty Thoma
 Naran (2005) as Member Kuruppu
 Nerariyan CBI (2005), a.k.a. Oru CBI Diary Kurippu Part IV as Vikram
 Isra (2005) as Thevar
 Manikyan (2005) as Sankaran
 Mayookham (2005)
 Thanmathra (2005) as Joseph
 Kilukkam Kilukilukkam (2006) as Nischal
 Rasathanthram (2006) as Vettivel Sundara Pandyan
 Thuruppu Gulan (2006) as Swami
 Chess (2006) as Narayanan
 Kalabham (2006)
 Nottam (2006) as Unni
 Arunam (2006)
 Raavanan (2006) as SI Sundaran
 Highway Police (2006) as S.I Swami
 Mauryan (2006)
 Chacko Randaman (2006)
 Pakal (2006)
 Aanachandam (2006)
 Classmates (2006) as Estappanachan
 Mahha Samudram (2006)
 Vasthavam (2006) as Unnithan Aasan
 Karutha Pakshikal (2006)
 Yes Your Honour (2006) as Sakshi Mani
 Baba Kalyani (2006) as Ramanan
 Palunku (2006) as Soman Pillai
 Anchil Oral Arjunan (2007) as Paul
 Changathipoocha (2007) as Raman Nair
 Detective (2007/I)
 Sketch (2007/II)
 The Speed Track (2007) as K. T. Kunjavara
 Chota Mumbai (2007) as 'Padakkam' Basheer
 Paranju Theeratha Visheshangal (2007) as Samuel
 Rakshakan (2007)
 Kaakki (2007) as Karunakara Menon
 Bharathan (2007)
 Hallo (2007) as Chandykunju
 Arabikatha (2007) as K. K. Kunjunni
 Anchil Oral Arjunan (2007) as Paul
 Sketch (2007) as Parthasaradhi
 Ayur Rekha (2007) as Thankappan Pilla
 Suhruthu (2007)
 Heart Beats (2007)
 Naalu Pennungal (2007)
 Paradesi (2007) as Abdul Rahman
 Nasrani (2007) as Oommachan
 Rock & Roll (2007) as Khader
 Janmam (2007)
 Katha Parayumpol (2007)
 Kangaroo (2007) as Mathew Abraham
 Flash (2007)
 Cycle (2008) as Kausthubhan
 Kovalam (2008) as P eter
 Aayudham (2008)
 Kabadi Kabadi (2008)
 Swarnam (2008)
 Omkaram (2008)
 Jubilee (2008) as Esho
 Positive (2008)
 SMS (2008)
 Aandavan (2008)
 Pakal Nakshatrangal (2008)
 Apoorva (2008)
 Sultan (2008) as Keshava Pilla
 Magic Lamp (2008) as Lalan
 Bullet (2008)
 Crazy Gopalan (2008) as Lavang Vasu
 Lollipop (2008) guest role
 Samayam (2008)
 Oru Pennum Randaanum (2008)
 One Way Ticket (2008)
 Madampi (2008) as Advocate
 Parunthu (2008) as Hemanth Bhai
 Twenty:20 (2008) as Sankarettan, assistant of Devaraja
 Ee Pattanathil Bhootham (2009)
 Makante Achan (2009) as Swami
 Pazhassi Raja (2009) as Kandan Menon
 Sagar Alias Jacky Reloaded (2009) as Ashok Kumar
 Passenger (2009) as Minister
 Swa le (2009)
  Patham Adhyayam (2009) as Adithya Varma
 Chemistry (2009)
 Bharya Swatham Suruthu (2009)
 Raamanam (2009)
 Gulmaal (2009)
 My Big Father (2009)
 Kerala Cafe (2009) in the segment Happy Journey
 Kadha, Samvidhanam Kunchakko (2009)
 Kappal Muthalaali (2009) as Dubai Chandi
 Sudharil Sudhan (2009)
 Paribhavam (2009)
 Vellathooval (2009)
 Oru Black & White Kudumbam (2009)
 Banaras (2009)
 I G Inspector General (2009)
 Doctor Patient (2009)
 Sanmanasullavan Appukuttan (2009) as Appukuttan
 Black Dalia (2009)
 Caribbeans (2009)
 Thirunakkara Perumal (2009) as Keshavan
 Kancheepurathe Kalyanam (2009)
 Calendar (2009)
 Angel John (2009) as Khader Moosa
 Evidam Swargamanu (2009) as Bhuvanendran
 Cheriya Kallanum Valiya Policum (2010) as Vattukuzhi Velayudhan
 Thanthonni (2010) as Dr.Thomas Vaidyan
 Kadaksham (2010)
 Ammanilavu (2010)
 Karaiyilekoru Kadal Dooram (2010)
 Senior Mandrake (2010)
 Sahasram (2010)
 Khilafath Inganeyum Oral (2010)
 Fiddle (2010)
 Valiyangadi (2010)
 Brahmasthram (2010) as Ponnappan
 Annarakkannanum Thannalayathu (2010)
 Chaverpada (2010)
 9 KK Road (2010)
 Kanyakumari Express (2010)
 Thaskara Lahala (2010)
 Sufi Paranja Katha (2010)
 Canvas (2010)
 Rama Ravanan (2010)
 Pathinonnil Vyazham (2010) as Nakulan
 Nayakan (2010)
 T D Dasan Std VI B (2010) as Menon
 24 Hours (2010) as Inspector at police station
 Malarvaadi Arts Club (2010) as Ragavan
 Elsamma Enna Aankutty (2010) as Member Ramanan
 April Fool (2010) as Tax auditor
 Annarakkannanum Thannalayathu (2010) as S. Gunasekharan
 Apoorvaragam (2010) as Charlie
 Athmakadha (2010) as Father Punnoos
 Shikkar (2010) as Mathayichan
 Marykkundoru Kunjaadu (2010) as Kundukuzhy Achan
 Sadgamaya (2010)
 Avan (2010)
 Pranchiyettan and the Saint (2010) as Pandit Deenadayal
 Chekavar (2010) as Nari Bahuleyan
 Best of Luck (2010) as Advocate Uthaman
 Ninnishtam Ennishtam 2 (2011)
 Sankaranum Mohananum (2011)
 3 Kings (2011)
 Venicile Vyapari (2011)
 Bombay Mittayi (2011)
 Kanakompathu (2011)
 Innanu Aa Kalyanam (2011)
 Athe Mazha Athe Veyil (2011)
 Naayika (2011)
 Makeup Man (2011)
 Ithu Nammude Katha (2011)
 Arjunan Saakshi (2011) as Ibrahim Mooppan
 Urumi (2011) as Cheenichery Kurup
 Kudumbasree Travels (2011) as Pachu
 Mohabbath (2011)
 Payyans (2011)
 Lucky Jokers (2011) as Krishanvarma Thampuran
 Killadi Raman (2011)
 Manikiakkallu (2011)
 Nadakame Ulakam (2011) as Labham Lambodaran
 Christian Brothers (2011) as Kochu Thoma
 Janapriyan (2011) as Achayan
 China Town (2011) as Jaggu Bhai
 Seniors (2011) as Adiyodi
 The Filmstaar (2011)
 The Train (2011)
 Maharaja Talkies (2011)
 Uppukandam Brothers Back in Action (2011)
 1993 Bombay, March 12 (2011)
 Swapna Sanchari (2011)
 Not Out (2011)
 The Metro (2011)
 Oru Nunakkadha (2011) as Inspector Thampi
 Teja Bhai & Family (2011) as Gopukumaran
 Indian Rupee (2011) as Chandy
 Pachuvum Kovalanum (2011)
 Race (2011) as Eldo
  Priyappetta Nattukare (2011) as Gandhi Kittan
 Sarkar Colony (2011)
 Kalabha Mazha (2011) as Vilwadiri Iyyer
 Veeraputhran (2011)
 Happy Durbar (2011) as S.I. Chacko
 Manushyamrugam (2011)
 Makaramanju (2011)
 Track (2011)
 Kunjettan (2011)
 Asuravithu (2012)
 Padmashree Bharath Dr.Saroj Kumar (2012) as Pachalam Bhasi
 Oru Kudumba Chithram (2012) as Gajendra Kurup
 Kanneerinu Madhuram (2012)
 Grihanathan (2012)
 Vaidooryam (2012)
 Casanovva (2012)
 Njanum Ente Familiyum (2012) as Dr. Easwarmoorthy
 Father's Day (2012)
 Cobra (2012)
 Orange (2012)
  Vaidooryam (2012) as Bhargavan Pilla
 Masters (2012)
 The King & the Commissioner (2012)
 Grandmaster (2012) as Rasheed
 Manjadikuru (2012)
 Thiruvambadi Thampan (2012) as Thiruvambadi Mathan Tharakan
 Ivan Megharoopan (2012)
 Pulival Pattanam (2012)
 Ezham Suryan (2012)
 Nadabrahmam (2012)
 Red Alert (2012)
 No. 66 Madhura Bus (2012)
 Parudeesa 2012
 Aakasmikam (2012)
 Ardhanareeswaran (2012) unreleased movie
 Yathra Thudarunnu (2013)
 Players (2013)
 Cowboy  (2013)
 Malayalakkar Residency (2014)
 Daivathinte Kayyoppu (2015)
 Mathruvandanam (2015)
 The Reporter (2015)
 3 Wicketinu 365 runs (2015) as CI Mansingh, Marthandan, Bhairavan, Fr. Thankachan and Padmadalakshan
 Ente Cinema - The Movie Festival (2016)
 Kaalchilambu (2021)
 Kabeerinte Divasangal (2021)
 B Nilavarayum Sharjah Palliyum (2021) as Sooraj Sukumar Nair
 Thi Mazha Thean Mazha (2022)
 CBI 5 The Brain (2022), as Vikram, CBI officer

Tamil

 Aadum Koothu (2005)

As a playback singer
 Chakkarayumma (1984) .... "Naalukaashum kayyil vechu"
 Ulsavamelam (1992) .... "Raamaa Sreeraama" (solo)
 Bandhukkal Shathrukkal (1993) .... "Veshangal" (solo)
 Kottaaram Veettile Apputtan (1998) .... "Ambottee"
 Hai (2005) .... "Vallee Vallee"
 Moz & Cat (2009) .... "Innu Kondu Theerum"

As director
 Kalyana Unnikal (1998)
 Annakutty Kodambakkam Vilikkunnu (1989)

As writer
 Champion Thomas (1990) (story)
 Witness (1988) (story)

Dialogue, screenplay
 Champion Thomas (1990)

Television
As actor
 Crime Branch (Kairali TV)
 Hukka Huwwa Meckado (Asianet)
 Ellam Mayajalam (Asianet)
 Sree Mahabhagavatham (Asianet)
 Kodachakram (Telefilm) (Asianet)Swami Ayyappan (Asianet)
 Devimahatymyam (Asianet)Smarakasilakal (Doordarshan)

As producer
 Hukka Huwwa Meckado (Asianet)
 Ellam Mayajalam'' (Asianet)

Further reading

References

External links 
 http://facebook.com/JagathySreekumarEntertainmentsOfficial/
 
 Jagathy Sreekumar at MSI

Indian male comedians
Indian male film actors
Kerala State Film Award winners
Living people
Male actors from Thiruvananthapuram
Male actors in Malayalam cinema
Filmfare Awards South winners
Malayalam film directors
Malayalam screenwriters
Malayalam comedians
20th-century Indian film directors
Indian male screenwriters
Film directors from Thiruvananthapuram
20th-century Indian male actors
21st-century Indian male actors
Screenwriters from Thiruvananthapuram
20th-century Indian dramatists and playwrights
Male actors in Malayalam television
Indian male television actors
Malayalam film producers
Film producers from Thiruvananthapuram
Singers from Thiruvananthapuram
Malayalam playback singers
20th-century Indian singers
21st-century Indian singers
20th-century Indian male writers
1950 births